Choerocoris paganus is a species of insect within the genus Choerocoris also known as the red jewel bug. They are generally not harmful, but can exude noxious chemicals. They live in woodlands and scrublands in Australia.

References

Insects described in 1775
Scutelleridae
Insects of Australia